Jaimi Tabb (born 9 February 2001) is an Australian rules footballer who played for Adelaide in the AFL Women's (AFLW).

AFLW career
 In August 2020, Tabb was delisted by Adelaide.

References

External links
 
 

Living people
2001 births
Adelaide Football Club (AFLW) players
Australian rules footballers from South Australia
Sportswomen from South Australia